The Melton Central Football Club,  known as the "Blues", is an Australian rules football club based in the satellite city of Melton, 35 km west of Melbourne. The club is affiliated with the Riddell District Football League.

Formed by the RDFL when it became obvious that the two other Melton-based sides (Melton and Melton South) were on the brink of leaving the competition to play in the Ballarat Football League. The RDFL wanted to keep representative side from the growing Melton urban area.

Consistently overshadowed by its two larger football clubs, 'the Centrals' have had to grind out an existence against the glamour of the larger clubs. Success has not been forthcoming as the club struggled throughout their time in the Riddell. Their best season was 2003 when they made it as far as the Preliminary Final.

The most recent Premiership was in 2009 when Melton Central won the Reserves Grand Final.

Results

Community
The club is a part of a number of projects aimed at improving awareness of charities and promotion of having a healthy lifestyle.

They are currently a part of the Good Sports program, which targets local sporting clubs to "build a healthier sporting nation". They currently have level 2 accreditation as a part of the program.

They also support the Call to Arms charity, which focuses on supporting males who have survived cancer. They have been supporting the charity since 2008, and have raised over $1500.

Team Song
We are the Navy Blues,

We are the old, dark, navy blues

We're the team that never lets you down

We're the only team from Melton town

With all the champions

They like to send us

We'll keep our end up

And they will know that they've been playing

Against the famous old dark blues

Go Centrals!

References

Books
History of Football in the Bendigo District - John Stoward - 
100 Years of Football in the Riddell District - John Stoward

Melton Central Football Club
1996 establishments in Australia
Sport in the City of Melton
Australian rules football clubs in Victoria (Australia)
Sports clubs established in 1996